Yetminster railway station serves the village of Yetminster in Dorset, England.

Yetminster railway station is managed by Great Western Railway.

History

The station was opened by the Great Western Railway on 20 January 1857 as part of their Wilts, Somerset and Weymouth line.

Facilities 
Yetminster has basic facilities including a small waiting shelter, a car park, a help point and bike racks. It has 2 entrances: one from the main road, and one from the car park, the latter of the two being step-free.

Services
South Western Railway used to run an additional service once on a Saturday between Weymouth and Yeovil Junction operating from late May to early September each year. This is a request stop so passengers must signal clearly to the driver if they wish to board the train.

References

Railway stations in Dorset
Railway stations in Great Britain opened in 1857
Former Great Western Railway stations
Railway stations served by Great Western Railway
Railway request stops in Great Britain
1857 establishments in England
DfT Category F2 stations